Epidendrum philocremnum is a species of orchid in the genus Epidendrum.

The plant is found in Ecuador, western South America.

References

External links 

philocremnum
Orchids of Ecuador
Orchids of South America